Whakatu or Whakatū may refer to the following places in New Zealand:
Whakatu, Hawke's Bay, a suburb of Hastings
Whakatū, the Māori name of Nelson, New Zealand
Wakatu, a suburb of Nelson